State Road 290 (NM 290) is a  state highway in the US state of New Mexico. NM 290's southern terminus is at NM 4 in Jemez Pueblo, and the northern terminus is at the end of route at US Forest Service Boundary.

Route description

NM 290 begins at NM 4 in Jemez Pueblo. It travels northward through rural desert terrain before ending at US Forest Service Boundary.

Major intersections

See also

References

290
Transportation in Sandoval County, New Mexico